Lika Kavzharadze (26 October 1959 – 11 October 2017) was a Georgian film actress best known for her role in Tengiz Abuladze's 1976 drama film The Wishing Tree.

Born in Tbilisi, Kavzharadze was trained as a pianist at the Tbilisi State Conservatoire, from which she graduated in 1973. In 1972, she was invited by the Kartuli Pilmi studio and starred in several films, most notably as Marita in the award-winning The Wishing Tree directed by Tengiz Abuladze in 1976.

She was found dead, at age 57, at her own apartment in Tbilisi on 11 October 2017. Police officials said they were looking into possible suicide.

Selected filmography

 Rotsa akvavda nushi (1972)
 Shadrevani (TV Short) (1972)
 Mshvenieri kostiumi (1973)
 Kavkasiuri romansi (1975)
 The Wishing Tree (1976)
 Pepela (1977)
 Satadarigo borbali (1977)
 Iveria, da sikvaruli (1978)
 Dyuma na Kavkaze (1980)
 Shekhvedramde, megobaro...(1980)
 Dmitry II  (1982)
 Blue Mountains (1983)
 Ojakhi (1985)
 Argonavtebi (1986)
 Dakarguli saganzuris sadzebnelad (1987)
 Chidaobas ra unda (1988)
 Tskhovreba Don Kikhotisa da Sancho Panchosi
 Shemsrulebeli 977 (1989)
 Spirali (1990)
 The Sun of the Sleepless (1992)
 Oqros oboba (1992)
 Mkholod ertkhel (1994)
 Chakluli suli (1994)
 Die kaukasische Nacht (1998)
 ABANDONED DON JUAN„მიტოვებული დონჟუანი“  [ 2000 ]                                                                                                                                                     
 TRILOGY„ტრილოგია“  [ 2009 ]
 Movie Lyrics: Medusa Gorgonas„მედუზა გორგონა“    [2012] http://geocinema.ge//ka/movies/7331
 MUSUES FOR PAINTERS „მხატვრის მუზები“ [ 2014 ]

References

External links
 
Lika Kavzharadze on Georgian National Filmography

1959 births
2017 deaths
Actors from Tbilisi
Film actresses from Georgia (country)
20th-century actresses from Georgia (country)
21st-century actresses from Georgia (country)